

The American Ethanol Green Flag Restart Award goes to the eligible driver that records the fastest average speed on restarts and finishes the race on the lead lap. A per-race $5,000 award is given to the winning driver, and a year-end $100,000 is given to the driver who wins the most awards during the season. The award is an official NASCAR contingency award sponsored by American Ethanol.

The inaugural award individual race award was presented to Paul Menard for his performance at the Daytona 500 at Daytona International Speedway on 20 February 2011.

For the 2023 season, NASCAR and Growth Energy changed the name of the award to "Get Bioethanol Green Flag Restart Award."

Season winners

2011 season

Individual race award winners

Total Award Wins by Driver

2012 season

Individual race award winners

Total Award Wins by Driver

2013 season

Individual race award winners

Total Award Wins by Driver

2014 season

Individual race award winners

Total Award Wins by Driver

2015 season

Individual race award winners

Total Award Wins by Driver

2016 season

Individual race award winners

Total Award Wins by Driver

2017 season

Individual race award winners

Total Award Wins by Driver

2018 season

Individual race award winners

Total Award Wins by Driver

2019 season

Individual race award winners

Total Award Wins by Driver

2020 season

Individual race award winners

Total Award Wins by Driver

2021 season

Individual race award winners

Total Award Wins by Driver

2022 season

Individual race award winners 

Bolded races indicate a NASCAR Major, also known as a Crown Jewel race.

Total Award Wins by Driver

Notes

References

Auto racing trophies and awards
American sports trophies and awards
NASCAR trophies and awards